Take Me to the World: A Sondheim 90th Birthday Celebration was a virtual concert celebrating the 90th birthday of Broadway composer Stephen Sondheim. The event also served as a fundraiser for Artists Striving to End Poverty (ASTEP).

Hosted by Raúl Esparza, whose appearances were curtailed due to technical difficulties, the concert featured many celebrities with ties to Sondheim singing his songs, alongside others offering birthday greetings between performances.

Context and timing
The April 26, 2020 livestream date coincided with the 50th anniversary of the opening night of the original Broadway production of Company.  The 2020 Broadway revival of that show, originally slated to open March 22 on Sondheim's birthday proper, had been scuttled by the closure of all Broadway productions due to the coronavirus pandemic.

Performances
In order of appearance
{| class="wikitable sortable"
|-
! scope="col" | Performer(s)
! scope="col" | Song
! scope="col" | Show
! scope="col" | Significance
|-
|Stephen Schwartz
|"Prologue"
|Follies
|Fellow Broadway composer
|-
|Broadway musicians
|"Overture"
|Merrily We Roll Along
|
|-
|Sutton Foster
|"There Won't Be Trumpets"
|Anyone Can Whistle
|Nurse Fay Apple in the Encores! concert of Anyone Can WhistleThe Baker's Wife in Into the Woods at the Hollywood Bowl
|-
|Neil Patrick Harris
|"Prologue" 
|Into the Woods
|Lee Harvey Oswald / The Balladeer in the original Broadway production of AssassinsBobby in the 2011 New York Philharmonic concert of CompanyTobias Ragg in the San Francisco Symphony Orchestra concert of Sweeney Todd: The Demon Barber of Fleet StreetCharles in the 2001 recording of Evening Primrose
|-
|Kelli O'Hara
|"What More Do I Need?"
|Saturday Night
|Young Hattie/Ensemble in the Broadway revival production of Follies
|-
|Judy Kuhn
|"What Can You Lose?"
|Dick Tracy 
|Fosca in the Off-Broadway production of Passion
|-
|Katrina Lenk
|"Johanna"
|Sweeney Todd: The Demon Barber of Fleet Street
|Bobbie in the third Broadway revival production of Company
|-
|Aaron Tveit
|"Marry Me a Little"
|Company
|John Wilkes Booth in the West End revival production of AssassinsBobby in the Barrington Stage Company production of Company
|-
|Beanie Feldstein and Ben Platt
|"It Takes Two"
|Into the Woods
|Mary Flynn and Charley Kringas respectively in the upcoming film adaptation of Merrily We Roll Along
|-
|Brandon Uranowitz
|"With So Little to Be Sure Of"
|Anyone Can Whistle
|Addison Mizner in the Encores! concert of Road Show
|-
|Melissa Errico
|"Children and Art"
|Sunday in the Park with George
|Dot/Marie in the Washington, D.C. production of Sunday in the Park with GeorgeClara in the Off-Broadway production of PassionLeona Samish in Encores! concert of Do I Hear a Waltz?Her 2018 recording Sondheim Sublime
|-
|Randy Rainbow
|"By the Sea"
|Sweeney Todd: The Demon Barber of Fleet Street
|Adapted musical parodies of Into the Woods "Prologue" and Follies "God-Why-Don't-You-Love-Me Blues" for political satire
|-
|Elizabeth Stanley
|"The Miller's Son"
|A Little Night Music
|April in the second Broadway revival of CompanyGussie Carnegie in the Encores! concert of Merrily We Roll Along
|-
|Mandy Patinkin
|"Lesson #8"
|Sunday in the Park with George
|Georges Seurat/George in the original Broadway production of Sunday in the Park with GeorgeBuddy Plummer in Lincoln Center's Follies in Concert
|-
|Maria Friedman
|"Broadway Baby"
|Follies
|Dot/Marie in the original West End production of Sunday in the Park with GeorgeFosca in the original West End production of PassionMary Flynn in a London production of Merrily We Roll AlongDirected a West End revival of Merrily We Roll Along
|-
|Lin-Manuel Miranda
|"Giants in the Sky"
|Into the Woods
|Fellow Broadway composerCharley Kringas in the Encores! concert of Merrily We Roll Along
|-
|Lea Salonga
|"Loving You"
|Passion
|The Witch in the Singaporean production of Into the WoodsMrs. Lovett in the Philippines production of Sweeney Todd: The Demon Barber of Fleet Street
|-
|Laura Benanti
|"I Remember"
|Evening Primrose
|Cinderella in the Broadway revival production of Into the WoodsLouise in the fourth Broadway revival of GypsyAnne in the Los Angeles Opera production of A Little Night Music
|-
|Chip Zien
|"No More"
|Into the Woods
|The Baker in the original Broadway production of Into the WoodsThe Mysterious Man in the Central Park production of Into the Woods
|-
|Josh Groban
|"Children Will Listen" / "Not While I'm Around"
|Into the Woods / Sweeney Todd: The Demon Barber of Fleet Street
|Covered the aforementioned songs on his album Stages
|-
|Brian Stokes Mitchell
|"The Flag Song"
|Assassins 
|Sweeney Todd in the Encores! concert of Sweeney Todd: The Demon Barber of Fleet StreetCast member in Library of Congress concert version of The Frogs
|-
|Michael Cerveris
|"Finishing the Hat"
|Sunday in the Park with George
|John Wilkes Booth in the original Broadway production of AssassinsSweeney Todd in the third Broadway revival of Sweeney Todd: The Demon Barber of Fleet StreetWilson Mizner in the Off-Broadway production of Road ShowGiorgio Bachetti in the Kennedy Center and Live from Lincoln Center productions, and Tenth Anniversary Concert of PassionCount Carl-Magnus in a regional production of A Little Night MusicGiorgio, Georges/George, and J. Bowden Hapgood, at the Ravinia Festival Concerts of Passion, Sunday in the Park with George, and Anyone Can Whistle respectively
|-
|Linda Lavin
|"The Boy From..."
|The Mad Show
|Cast member of The Mad ShowRose (replacement) in the second Broadway revival of GypsyHattie Walker in Kennedy Center production of Follies
|-
|Alexander Gemignani
|"Buddy's Blues"
|Follies
|John Hinckley in the original Broadway production of AssassinsBeadle Bamford in the second Broadway revival of Sweeney Todd: The Demon Barber of Fleet StreetLieutenant Torasso in the Live from Lincoln Center production of PassionBoatman/Dennis in the first Broadway revival of Sunday in the Park with GeorgeAddison Mizner in the Off-Broadway production of Road Show
|-
|Ann Harada, Austin Ku, Kelvin Moon Loh and Thom Sesma
|"Someone In a Tree"
|Pacific Overtures
|Cast members of the Off-Broadway revival cast of Pacific Overtures
|-
|Raúl Esparza
|"Take Me to the World"
|Evening Primrose
|Georges Seurat/George in the Sondheim Celebration production of Sunday in the Park with GeorgeCharley Kringas in the Sondheim Celebration production of Merrily We Roll AlongBobby in the second Broadway revival production of CompanyHapgood in the Encores! concert of Anyone Can WhistleWilson Mizner in the Encores! concert of Road Show
|-
|Donna Murphy
|"Send In the Clowns"
|A Little Night Music
|Fosca in the original Broadway production of PassionPhyllis Rogers Stone in the Encores! concert of FolliesMayoress in the Encores! concert of Anyone Can WhistleThe Witch in the Central Park production of Into the Woods
|-
|Christine Baranski, Meryl Streep and Audra McDonald
|"The Ladies Who Lunch"
|Company
|Baranski: Clarisse in the original Off-Broadway production of Sunday in the Park with George; Mrs. Lovett in the Sondheim Celebration production of Sweeney Todd: The Demon Barber of Fleet Street; Cinderella's Stepmother in the film adaptation of Into the Woods; Phyllis in the London production of Follies; Carlotta Campion in the Encores! concert of Follies Streep: The Witch in the film adaptation of Into the Woods, Ensemble member in original production of The Frogs.McDonald:''' Clara in the Live from Lincoln Center production of Passion; Beggar Woman in the Live from Lincoln Center production and New York Philharmonic concert of Sweeney Todd: The Demon Barber of Fleet Street; Clara and Nurse Fay Apple at the Ravinia Festival Concerts of Passion and Anyone Can Whistle respectively
|-
|Annaleigh Ashford and Jake Gyllenhaal
|"Move On"
|Sunday in the Park with George|Dot/Marie and Georges Seurat/George in the second Broadway revival of Sunday in the Park with George|-
|Patti LuPone
|"Anyone Can Whistle"
|Anyone Can Whistle|Mrs. Lovett in the New York Philharmonic concert and third Broadway revival of Sweeney Todd: The Demon Barber of Fleet StreetFosca in the Live from Lincoln Center production of PassionRose in the fourth Broadway revival of GypsyJoanne in the New York Philharmonic concert, second West End, and third Broadway revivals of CompanyMrs. Lovett, Desiree Armfeldt, Fosca, Yvonne, Cora Hoover Hooper, and Rose in the Ravinia Festival concerts of Sweeney Todd: The Demon Barber of Fleet Street, A Little Night Music, Passion, Sunday in the Park with George, Anyone Can Whistle, and Gypsy respectively
|-
|Bernadette Peters
|"No One Is Alone"
|Into the Woods|Dot/Marie in the original Broadway production of Sunday in the Park with GeorgeThe Witch in the original Broadway production of Into the WoodsFay in the 1995 Carnegie Hall concert of Anyone Can WhistleRose in the third Broadway revival of GypsyDesiree (second replacement) in the second Broadway revival of A Little Night MusicSally in the third Broadway revival of FolliesOne of the main performers in the 2013 Sondheim revue A Bed and A Chair: A New York Love Letter Recorded the albums Sondheim, Etc. – Bernadette Peters Live At Carnegie Hall and Sondheim Etc., Etc. Live At Carnegie Hall: The Rest of It 
|-
|Company
|"I'm Still Here"
|Follies|
|}

Other appearancesIn order of first appearance''

References

External links

2020 concerts
Benefit concerts
COVID-19 pandemic benefit concerts
Impact of the COVID-19 pandemic on the performing arts
Impact of the COVID-19 pandemic on the music industry
Cultural responses to the COVID-19 pandemic